In mathematics, the Hermite polynomials are a classical orthogonal polynomial sequence.

The polynomials arise in:
 signal processing as Hermitian wavelets for wavelet transform analysis
 probability, such as the Edgeworth series, as well as in connection with Brownian motion;
 combinatorics, as an example of an Appell sequence, obeying the umbral calculus;
 numerical analysis as Gaussian quadrature; 
 physics, where they give rise to the eigenstates of the quantum harmonic oscillator; and they also occur in some cases of the heat equation (when the term  is present);
 systems theory in connection with nonlinear operations on Gaussian noise. 
 random matrix theory in Gaussian ensembles.

Hermite polynomials were defined by Pierre-Simon Laplace in 1810, though in scarcely recognizable form, and studied in detail by Pafnuty Chebyshev in 1859. Chebyshev's work was overlooked, and they were named later after Charles Hermite, who wrote on the polynomials in 1864, describing them as new. They were consequently not new, although Hermite was the first to define the multidimensional polynomials in his later 1865 publications.

Definition
Like the other classical orthogonal polynomials, the Hermite polynomials can be defined from several different starting points. Noting from the outset that there are two different standardizations in common use, one convenient method is as follows:

 The "probabilist's Hermite polynomials" are given by 
 while the "physicist's Hermite polynomials" are given by 

These equations have the form of a Rodrigues' formula and can also be written as,

The two definitions are not exactly identical; each is a rescaling of the other:

These are Hermite polynomial sequences of different variances; see the material on variances below.

is the probability density function for the normal distribution with expected value 0 and standard deviation 1.

 The first eleven probabilist's Hermite polynomials are: 
 The first eleven physicist's Hermite polynomials are:

Properties
The th-order Hermite polynomial is a polynomial of degree . The probabilist's version  has leading coefficient 1, while the physicist's version  has leading coefficient .

Symmetry

Orthogonality
These polynomials are orthogonal with respect to the weight function (measure)
 or 
i.e., we have

Furthermore,

or

where  is the Kronecker delta.

The probabilist polynomials are thus orthogonal with respect to the standard normal probability density function.

Completeness 
The Hermite polynomials (probabilist's or physicist's) form an orthogonal basis of the Hilbert space of functions satisfying

in which the inner product is given by the integral

including the Gaussian weight function  defined in the preceding section

For an orthogonal system, completeness is equivalent to the fact that the 0 function is the only function  orthogonal to all functions in the system.

Since the linear span of Hermite polynomials is the space of all polynomials, one has to show (in physicist case) that if  satisfies

for every , then .

One possible way to do this is to appreciate that the entire function

vanishes identically. Variants of the above completeness proof apply to other weights with exponential decay.

In the Hermite case, it is also possible to prove an explicit identity that implies completeness (see section on the Completeness relation below).

Hermite's differential equation
The probabilist's Hermite polynomials are solutions of the differential equation

where  is a constant.

Rewriting the differential equation as an eigenvalue problem

the Hermite polynomials  may be understood as eigenfunctions of the differential operator  . This eigenvalue problem is called the Hermite equation, although the term is also used for the closely related equation
 
whose solution is uniquely given in terms of physicist's Hermite polynomials in the form , where  denotes a constant, after imposing the boundary condition that  should be polynomially bounded at infinity.

The general solutions to the above second-order differential equations are in fact linear combinations of both Hermite polynomials and confluent hypergeometric functions of the first kind. For example, for the physicist's Hermite equation

the general solution takes the form

The latter functions are compactly represented as  where   are Confluent hypergeometric functions of the first kind. The conventional Hermite polynomials may also be expressed in terms of confluent hypergeometric functions, see below.

With more general boundary conditions, the Hermite polynomials can be generalized to obtain more general analytic functions for complex-valued . An explicit formula of Hermite polynomials in terms of contour integrals  is also possible.

Recurrence relation
The sequence of probabilist's Hermite polynomials also satisfies the recurrence relation

Individual coefficients are related by the following recursion formula:
 

For the physicist's polynomials, assuming 

we have

Individual coefficients are related by the following recursion formula:

The Hermite polynomials constitute an Appell sequence, i.e., they are a polynomial sequence satisfying the identity

Equivalently, by Taylor-expanding,

These umbral identities are self-evident and included in the differential operator representation detailed below, 

In consequence, for the th derivatives the following relations hold:

It follows that the Hermite polynomials also satisfy the recurrence relation

Turán's inequalities are

Moreover, the following multiplication theorem holds:

Binomial Umbral expansion

From 

One can formally expand using the binomial formula:

Explicit expression
The physicist's Hermite polynomials can be written explicitly as

These two equations may be combined into one using the floor function:

Inverse explicit expression
The inverse of the above explicit expressions, that is, those for monomials in terms of probabilist's Hermite polynomials  are

The corresponding expressions for the physicist's Hermite polynomials  follow directly by properly scaling this:

Generating function
The Hermite polynomials are given by the exponential generating function

One can also derive the (physicist's) generating function by using Cauchy's integral formula to write the Hermite polynomials as

Using this in the sum 
 
one can evaluate the remaining integral using the calculus of residues and arrive at the desired generating function.

Expected values
If  is a random variable with a normal distribution with standard deviation 1 and expected value , then

The moments of the standard normal (with expected value zero) may be read off directly from the relation for even indices:

where  is the double factorial. Note that the above expression is a special case of the representation of the probabilist's Hermite polynomials as moments:

Asymptotic expansion
 
holds true. For certain cases concerning a wider range of evaluation, it is necessary to include a factor for changing amplitude:

which, using Stirling's approximation, can be further simplified, in the limit, to

This expansion is needed to resolve the wavefunction of a quantum harmonic oscillator such that it agrees with the classical approximation in the limit of the correspondence principle.

A better approximation, which accounts for the variation in frequency, is given by

A finer approximation, which takes into account the uneven spacing of the zeros near the edges, makes use of the substitution 
 
with which one has the uniform approximation

Similar approximations hold for the monotonic and transition regions. Specifically, if 
 
then

where  is the Airy function of the first kind.

Special values
The physicist's Hermite polynomials evaluated at zero argument  are called Hermite numbers.

which satisfy the recursion relation .

In terms of the probabilist's polynomials this translates to

Relations to other functions

Laguerre polynomials
The Hermite polynomials can be expressed as a special case of the Laguerre polynomials:

Relation to confluent hypergeometric functions
The physicist's Hermite polynomials can be expressed as a special case of the parabolic cylinder functions:

in the right half-plane, where  is Tricomi's confluent hypergeometric function. Similarly,

where  is Kummer's confluent hypergeometric function.

Differential-operator representation
There are no delicate questions of convergence of this series when it operates on polynomials, since all but finitely many terms vanish.

Since the power-series coefficients of the exponential are well known, and higher-order derivatives of the monomial  can be written down explicitly, this differential-operator representation gives rise to a concrete formula for the coefficients of  that can be used to quickly compute these polynomials.

Essentially the Weierstrass transform thus turns a series of Hermite polynomials into a corresponding Maclaurin series.

The existence of some formal power series  with nonzero constant coefficient, such that , is another equivalent to the statement that these polynomials form an Appell sequence. Since they are an Appell sequence, they are a fortiori a Sheffer sequence.

Contour-integral representation
From the generating-function representation above, we see that the Hermite polynomials have a representation in terms of a contour integral, as

with the contour encircling the origin.

Generalizations
The probabilist's Hermite polynomials defined above are orthogonal with respect to the standard normal probability distribution, whose density function is

which has expected value 0 and variance 1.

Scaling, one may analogously speak of generalized Hermite polynomials

of variance , where  is any positive number. These are then orthogonal with respect to the normal probability distribution whose density function is

They are given by

Now, if 

then the polynomial sequence whose th term is

is called the umbral composition of the two polynomial sequences. It can be shown to satisfy the identities

and

The last identity is expressed by saying that this parameterized family of polynomial sequences is known as a cross-sequence. (See the above section on Appell sequences and on the differential-operator representation, which leads to a ready derivation of it.

"Negative variance"
Since polynomial sequences form a group under the operation of umbral composition, one may denote by

the sequence that is inverse to the one similarly denoted, but without the minus sign, and thus speak of Hermite polynomials of negative variance.

These arise as moments of normal probability distributions: The th moment of the normal distribution with expected value  and variance  is

where  is a random variable with the specified normal distribution. A special case of the cross-sequence identity then says that

Applications

Hermite functions
One can define the Hermite functions (often called Hermite-Gaussian functions) from the physicist's polynomials:

Thus, 

Since these functions contain the square root of the weight function and have been scaled appropriately, they are orthonormal:

This fact is equivalent to the corresponding statement for Hermite polynomials (see above).

The Hermite functions are closely related to the Whittaker function  :

and thereby to other parabolic cylinder functions.

The Hermite functions satisfy the differential equation

This equation is equivalent to the Schrödinger equation for a harmonic oscillator in quantum mechanics, so these functions are the eigenfunctions.

Recursion relation 
Following recursion relations of Hermite polynomials, the Hermite functions obey

and

Extending the first relation to the arbitrary th derivatives for any positive integer  leads to

Cramér's inequality
For real , the Hermite functions satisfy the following bound due to Harald Cramér and Jack Indritz:

Hermite functions as eigenfunctions of the Fourier transform
The Hermite functions  are a set of eigenfunctions of the continuous Fourier transform . This gives

The Fourier transform of the left side is given by

The Fourier transform of the right side is given by

Wigner distributions of Hermite functions
The Wigner distribution function of the th-order Hermite function is related to the th-order Laguerre polynomial. The Laguerre polynomials are 

leading to the oscillator Laguerre functions

For all natural integers , it is straightforward to see that

where the Wigner distribution of a function  is defined as

This is a fundamental result for the quantum harmonic oscillator discovered by Hip Groenewold in 1946 in his PhD thesis. It is the standard paradigm of quantum mechanics in phase space.

There are further relations between the two families of polynomials.

Combinatorial interpretation of coefficients
Equivalently, it is the number of involutions of an -element set with precisely  fixed points, or in other words, the number of matchings in the complete graph on  vertices that leave  vertices uncovered (indeed, the Hermite polynomials are the matching polynomials of these graphs). The sum of the absolute values of the coefficients gives the total number of partitions into singletons and pairs, the so-called telephone numbers
 1, 1, 2, 4, 10, 26, 76, 232, 764, 2620, 9496,... .

This combinatorial interpretation can be related to complete exponential Bell polynomials as

where  for all .

These numbers may also be expressed as a special value of the Hermite polynomials:

Completeness relation 
The Christoffel–Darboux formula for Hermite polynomials reads

Moreover, the following completeness identity for the above Hermite functions holds in the sense of distributions:

This distributional identity follows  by taking  in Mehler's formula, valid when :

which is often stated equivalently as a separable kernel,

It follows that

The Hermite polynomial is then represented as

and this yields the desired resolution of the identity result, using again the Fourier transform of Gaussian kernels under the substitution

See also

Hermite transform
Legendre polynomials
Mehler kernel
Parabolic cylinder function
Romanovski polynomials
Turán's inequalities

Notes

References

 Oeuvres complètes 12, pp.357-412, English translation .
 - 2000 references of Bibliography on Hermite polynomials.

External links

 GNU Scientific Library — includes C version of Hermite polynomials, functions, their derivatives and zeros (see also GNU Scientific Library)

Orthogonal polynomials
Polynomials
Special hypergeometric functions